Tarko-Sale (Nenets: Тарка’ саля, Tarkaꜧ salja; Forest Nenets: Таӆка’ хаӆя) is a town and the administrative center of Purovsky District in Yamalo-Nenets Autonomous Okrug, Russia. The population of Tarko-Sale was

History 
Tarko-Sale was founded in 1932, granted urban-type settlement status in 1976, and town status on March 23, 2004.

The Purovsky District Museum of History and Local Lore is located in Tarko-Sale. The museum houses over 26,990 items in its collection, including items related to natural history, ethnography, archeology, local history, and fine art.

Geography
Tarko-Sale is located near the Yamal and Gyda peninsulas, south of the Kara Sea. It lies just south of the Arctic Circle, in the Northern Temperate Zone. It has a subarctic climate with the Köppen climate classification Dfc.

Nearby towns include Gubinsky, Muravlenko, and Urengoy, as well as the Kharampur and Urengoy gas fields. The nearest city is Novy Urengoy.

Climate

Administrative and municipal status
Within the framework of administrative divisions, Tarko-Sale serves as the administrative center of Purovsky District, to which it is directly subordinated. As a municipal division, the town of Tarko-Sale is incorporated within Purovsky Municipal District as Tarko-Sale Urban Settlement.

Economy

Russia's largest independent gas producer, Novatek, is headquartered in Tarko-Sale. Oil and natural gas production is a key industry in the region, with an estimated 80% of Russia's natural gas and 15% of the world's natural gas supply stored in Yamalo-Nenets Autonomous Okrug.

Tarko-Sale also hosts a wood processing plant by Yamal LPK LLC (Ямальский лесопромышленный комплекс), which produces glued laminated timber and MHM panels.

The Tarko-Sale Airport was founded in 1962 and expanded greatly after the discovery of oil and natural gas deposits in the area in the 1970s. Its IATA code is TQL.

A 500kV substation is scheduled to be built in Tarko-Sale in 2021-2022.

Gallery

References

Notes

Sources

Cities and towns in Yamalo-Nenets Autonomous Okrug